William Pierson (July 17, 1926 – August 27, 2004) was an American television, motion picture and stage actor, best known for his raspy voice and his role as Marko the Mailman in the 1953 film Stalag 17 as well as a recurring role as Dean Travers on the 1970s ABC-TV series  Three's Company.

Biography

Life and career
Pierson, who was born and raised in Brooklyn, New York originally played the role of Marko in the original Broadway production of Stalag 17, and was tapped by director Billy Wilder for the role in the 1953 motion picture production. Other Broadway appearances included in High Button Shoes, Make Mine Manhattan, Reuben, Reuben, and in a national touring company of The Odd Couple. Pierson, who was well recognized by his distinctive, raspy delivery, also appeared in the Off Broadway production Smile, Smile, Smile. After Wilder brought him to Hollywood, he appeared in films such as Operation Madball and Fun with Dick and Jane (1977).

Pierson enjoyed a busy career in television and film, a career which spanned four decades from the 1950s through the 1980s, which included appearances on such TV shows such as Studio One and Kraft Theatre, The Jackie Gleason Show, All In The Family, One Day At A Time, Diff'rent Strokes, The Facts Of Life in addition to his role as Dean Travers on Three's Company.

Pierson died from respiratory failure in Newton, New Jersey. He had been residing for years at the Valley View Care Center in Newton due to declining health. He was survived by two brothers, Jefferson Pierson of New Jersey and Howard Pierson of Florida.

Filmography

References

External links

 
 
 

1926 births
2004 deaths
Deaths from respiratory failure
American male television actors
American male stage actors
American male film actors
People from Brooklyn
People from Newton, New Jersey
Male actors from New York City
20th-century American male actors